Pierre Bérard (born 23 May 1991) is a French rugby union player. His position is Wing and he currently plays for Castres olympique in the Top 14.

References

1991 births
Living people
French rugby union players
Montpellier Hérault Rugby players
Rugby union scrum-halves
Union Sportive Bressane players
Stade Rochelais players
Castres Olympique players
AS Béziers Hérault players